NuMex is the moniker used for products created by the Agriculture Experimentation Station of New Mexico State University.

The AES is responsible for a large variety of unusual agricultural cultivars, including a key breed of onion simply called the Numex, and a great many cultivars of chili pepper, including the Numex Twilight, a curious breed with upright fruit which starts purple and then turns yellow, orange, and red. Including the green leaves, this plant has every color of the rainbow except blue.

References

External links

New Mexico State University